The O. W. Coburn School of Law was the law school of Oral Roberts University.  The school was named after donor Orin Wesley Coburn, the founder of Coburn Optical Industries and the father of future US politician Tom Coburn.

The school opened in 1979. Its founding dean was Charles Kothe, a Tulsa, Oklahoma labor attorney. Other professors included Anita Hill, John Eidsmoe, Gary Lane, Herb Titus, and Rutherford Institute founder John W. Whitehead.

In 1986, the school closed, with its 190,000 volume law library, as well as 5 professors and 23 students, moving to CBN University (now Regent University). Since the new CBN law school would not initially be accredited (and in fact did not receive provisional accreditation until 1989), students graduating in spring 1987 were allowed to state they graduated from Coburn, in order to be listed as graduating from an accredited school.

U.S. Representative Michele Bachmann began attending Coburn the first year it opened, and graduated as part of its last class.

Accreditation controversy
In May 1981, the American Bar Association (ABA), which provides accreditation for US law schools, denied Coburn's initial application for provisional accreditation. Oral Roberts University's requirement that students must take an oath of religious faith was considered to be contrary to ABA's Standard 211, which states:

The school sued the ABA, claiming that the denial was a violation of their First Amendment rights. A judge enjoined the ABA from denying provisional accreditation, ruling that the ABA's role in accreditation is equivalent to a "state action," and that Standard 211 denied a private institution's right to freedom of religion without any restrictions by the state.

After a "spirited debate," the ABA's House of Delegates in August 1981 voted 147 to 127 to amend Standard 211 to add a clause including the phrase:

Coburn was then granted provisional accreditation.

References

External links
 The Regent University Law Library: The First Thirty Years—Contains material on Coburn's establishment, history, and dissolution

Educational institutions established in 1979
Educational institutions disestablished in 1986
Law schools in Oklahoma
Defunct private universities and colleges in Oklahoma
1979 establishments in Oklahoma
1986 disestablishments in Oklahoma
Defunct law schools